Erbessa celata is a moth of the family Notodontidae first described by William Warren in 1906. It is found in Peru.

References

Moths described in 1906
Notodontidae of South America